Fernando Manuel Mendes Mira (born 20 April 1962) is a Portuguese former footballer and football manager.

References

1962 births
Living people
People from Cartaxo
Association football midfielders
Portuguese footballers
C.D. Estarreja players
S.C. Pombal players
Portuguese football managers
Primeira Liga managers
Liga Portugal 2 managers
Associação Naval 1º de Maio managers
C.D. Trofense managers
Sportspeople from Santarém District